The 2017 Open Harmonie mutuelle will be a professional tennis tournament played on hard courts. It will be the fourteenth edition of the tournament which will be part of the 2017 ATP Challenger Tour. It will take place in Saint-Brieuc, France between 28 March and 2 April 2017.

Point distribution

Singles main-draw entrants

Seeds

 Rankings are as of March 20, 2017.

Other entrants
The following players received wildcards into the singles main draw:
  Rémi Boutillier
  Enzo Couacaud
  Evan Furness
  Corentin Moutet

The following player received entry into the singles main draw using a protected ranking:
  Simone Bolelli

The following player received entry into the singles main draw as an alternate:
  Laurent Lokoli

The following players received entry from the qualifying draw:
  Egor Gerasimov
  David Guez
  Hugo Nys
  Oscar Otte

Champions

Singles

 Egor Gerasimov def.  Tobias Kamke 7–6(7–3), 7–6(7–5).

Doubles

 Andre Begemann /  Frederik Nielsen def.  David O'Hare /  Joe Salisbury  6–3, 6–4.

External links
Official Website

Open Harmonie mutuelle
Saint-Brieuc Challenger
March 2017 sports events in France
April 2017 sports events in Europe